Loud and Clear is the fourth studio album released by The O.C. Supertones and features Toby Mac on the song "What It Comes To". This is also the first album that included guitarist, Ethan Luck. Although Luck was not pictured, he is listed under "additional musicians" in the credits; he did not officially join the band until after the album was finished. Drummer Jason Carson left the band after the release of the album to take a position in youth ministry. However, he returned with the band in 2010 after their hiatus.

Musically the album integrates scratching and hip-hop vocal delivery with their brand of ska. The songwriting was handled primarily by Morginsky and Terusa, and was considered more advanced than on previous albums. Themes range from apologetics to doubting God, but still contain elements of praise and worship and pop culture.

Track listing
All songs written by Matt Morginsky and Tony Terusa, except where noted.
"Escape from Reason" - 3:18
"What It Comes To" [featuring tobyMac] (Morginsky, Terusa, Toby McKeehan) - 3:39
"Jury Duty" - 4:15
"Lift Me Up" - 4:36
"Return of the Revolution" [featuring Gospel Gangstaz] - 4:26
"Wilderness" - 4:14
"Father's World" - 3:33
"Pandora's Box" - 2:23
"Forward to the Future" - 3:56
"Another Show" - 2:47
"20/20" - 3:54
"Who Could It Be" - 2:59
"Spend It with You" - 4:23

Personnel 

The O.C. Supertones
 Matt Morginsky – vocals
 Tony Terusa – bass
 Jason Carson – drums
 Dan Spencer – trombone
 Darren Mettler – trumpet

Additional musicians
 Phil Parlapiano – keyboards
 Ethan Luck – guitars
 Jung Park – guitars
 Frank Lenz – drums
 Todd Collins – backing vocals (2)
 TobyMac – guest vocals (2)
 Gospel Gangstaz – guest vocals (5)

Production
 Neill King – producer at The Village Recorder, Los Angeles, California, executive producer, recording, mixing at Skip Saylor Recording, Los Angeles, California
 Todd Collins – chorus vocal  engineer (2)
 Dan Shike – chorus vocal engineer (2)
 Rene Lopez – assistant engineer 
 Regula Merz – assistant engineer 
 Jason Wormer – assistant engineer
 Brian Gardner – mastering at Bernie Grundman Mastering (Hollywood, California)
 Suzy "Splab" Hutchinson – design, layout 
 Matthew Barnes – photography

References

2000 albums
The O.C. Supertones albums